Théo-Léo De Smet (born 9 November 1917) was a Belgian water polo player. He competed at the 1948 Summer Olympics and the 1952 Summer Olympics.

See also
 Belgium men's Olympic water polo team records and statistics
 List of men's Olympic water polo tournament goalkeepers

References

External links
 

1917 births
Possibly living people
Belgian male water polo players
Water polo goalkeepers
Olympic water polo players of Belgium
Water polo players at the 1948 Summer Olympics
Water polo players at the 1952 Summer Olympics
Sportspeople from Antwerp
20th-century Belgian people